Nashua High School may refer to a school in Nashua, New Hampshire:

Nashua High School South, formerly known as Nashua High School, a high school in Nashua, New Hampshire, United States
Nashua High School North, a high school in Nashua, New Hampshire, United States
or
Nashua High School in Nashua, Montana